The Chatterton River is a river of north Canterbury, New Zealand. It flows south through Hanmer Forest Park, immediately to the west of the town of Hanmer Springs, before flowing into the Percival River shortly before the latter itself flows into the Waiau River

See also
List of rivers of New Zealand

References
Land Information New Zealand - Search for Place Names

Rivers of Canterbury, New Zealand
Rivers of New Zealand